Maria Dolgikh (born July 24, 1987) is a Russian table tennis player. She competed at the 2016 Summer Olympics in the women's singles event, in which she was eliminated in the first round by Jian Fang Lay.

References

1987 births
Living people
Russian female table tennis players
Olympic table tennis players of Russia
Table tennis players at the 2016 Summer Olympics
20th-century Russian women
21st-century Russian women